Tumaslı or Tumasly or Tumaslu may refer to:
 Tumaslı, Barda, Azerbaijan
 Tumaslı, Nakhchivan, Azerbaijan